The following is a list of songs by Mos Def organized by alphabetical order. The songs on the list are all included in official label-released albums, soundtracks and singles, but not white label or other non-label releases. As of August 30, 2009, Mos Def had released 158 songs.

A 
 "Another World"	– Mos Def	– We Are Hip-Hop, Me, You, Everybody (Disc 4)
 "A Brighter Day (with Ronnie Jordan)"	– Mos Def	– We Are Hip-Hop, Me, You, Everybody (Disc 1)
 "A Ha"	– Mos Def	– True Magic
 "A Soldier's Dream"	– Mos Def	 – We Are Hip-Hop, Me, You, Everybody (Disc 1)
 "A Tree Never Grown"	– Mos Def	– We Are Hip-Hop, Me, You, Everybody (Disc 4)
 "All My People (The Body Rock Party Break Remixed by Dr. Luke)"	– Mos Def – We Are Hip-Hop, Me, You, Everybody (Disc 2)
 "All Praises Due (A.D.L.I.B.)"	– Mos Def	– We Are Hip-Hop, Me, You, Everybody (Disc 3)
 "Another World (Ambivalence Remix)"	– Mos Def	– We Are Hip-Hop, Me, You, Everybody (Disc 2)
 "Another World"	– Black Star	– We Are Hip-Hop, Me, You, Everybody (Disc 1)
 "Another World (Remix)"	– Mos Def	– We Are Hip-Hop, Me, You, Everybody (Disc 3)
 "Astronomy (8th Light)"	– Black Star – Black Star
 "Auditorium (featuring Slick Rick)"	– Mos Def	– The Ecstatic

B 
 "B Boys Will B Boys"	– Black Star – Black Star
 "B.M.T. (featuring Biz & Towa Tei)"	– Mos Def	– We Are Hip-Hop, Me, You, Everybody (Disc 2)
 "B-Boy Document '99 (with High & Mighty & Skillz)"	– Mos Def – Soundbombing 2
 "Beautiful (Remix – Mary J. Blige)"	– Mos Def	– We Are Hip-Hop, Me, You, Everybody (Disc 2)
 "Bedstuy Parade & Funeral March (featuring Paul Oscher)"	– Mos Def	– The New Danger
 "Beef"	– Mos Def	– Mos Definite
 "Big Brother Beat"	– Mos Def	– We Are Hip-Hop, Me, You, Everybody (Disc 4)
 "Bin Laden (featuring Mos Def & Eminem)" – Immortal Technique
 "Blue Black Jack (featuring Shuggie Otis)"	– Mos Def	– The New Danger
 "Body Rock (with Q-Tip & Tash)"	– Mos Def
 "Boogie Man Song"	– Mos Def	– The New Danger
 "Brooklyn"	– Mos Def	– Black On Both Sides
 "Brown Skin Lady"	– Black Star – Black Star
 "Bullshittin' (with N'Dea Davenport)"	– Mos Def	– We Are Hip-Hop, Me, You, Everybody (Disc 2)
 "Brown Sugar (Extra Sweet)" – Mos Def – Faith Evans – Brown Sugar Soundtrack – 2001

C 
 "Caldonia" – Mos Def – Lackawanna Blues (Broadway play)
 "Can U See The Pride In The Panthere" – Mos Def – The Dangerous Mix
 "Casa Bey"	– Mos Def	– The Ecstatic
 "Champion Requiem"	– Mos Def	– The New Danger
 "Children's Story"	– Black Star – Black Star
 "Climb (featuring Vinia Mojica)"	– Mos Def	– Black On Both Sides
 "Close Edge"	– Mos Def	– The New Danger
 "Crime & Medicine"	– Mos Def	– True Magic
 "Crying At Airports (Whale)"	– Mos Def	– We Are Hip-Hop, Me, You, Everybody (Disc 3)

D 
 "Dead Certainty"	– Mos Def	– We Are Hip-Hop, Me, You, Everybody (Disc 4)
 "Destination Love" – Mos Def – Lackawanna Blues (Broadway play)
 "Definition"	– Black Star – Black Star
 "Do It Now (featuring Busta Rhymes)"	– Mos Def	– Black On Both Sides
 "Do Your Best (featuring Mos Def)"	– Femi Kuti	– Fight To Win
 "Dollar Day (released on Audio 3 as Katrina Clap)"	– Mos Def	– True Magic
 "Double Trouble (with The Roots)" – Mos Def – We Are Hip-Hop, Me, You, Everybody (Disc 1)
 "Drunk And Hot Girls (featuring Mos Def)" – Kanye West – Graduation

E 
 "Excellence"	– Mos Def	– Mos Definite

F 
 "Fake Bonanza"	– Mos Def	– True Magic
 "Fear Not Of Man"	– Mos Def	– Black On Both Sides
 "Fix Up" – Blackstar – Black star Aretha
 "Foundation (featuring DJ Honda)"– Mos Def – The Dangerous Mix
 "Freaky Black"	– Mos Def	– The New Danger
 "Freak Daddy" – Mos Def – Soundbombing III
 "Free Flowin' (featuring Talib Kweli)"	– Mos Def	– Mos Definite
 "Freestyle (with Tony Touch)"	– Mos Def	– We Are Hip-Hop, Me, You, Everybody (Disc 2)

G 
 "Ghetto Rock"	– Mos Def	– The New Danger
 "Got"	– Mos Def	– Black On Both Sides
 "Grown Man Business (Fresh Vintage Bottles) [featuring Minnesota]" – Mos Def – The New Danger

H 
 "Habitat"	– Mos Def	– Black On Both Sides
 "Hard Margin (featuring Talib Kweli)"	– Mos Def	– Mos Definite
 "Hater Players"	– Black Star – Black Star
 "High Drama"	– Mos Def	– We Are Hip-Hop, Me, You, Everybody (Disc 4)
 "High Drama (Remix) [with Mike Zoot]"	– Mos Def	– We Are Hip-Hop, Me, You, Everybody (Disc 3)
 "Hip-Hop"	– Mos Def	– Black On Both Sides
 "History (featuring Talib Kweli)"	– Mos Def	– The Ecstatic
 "Hurricane"	– Mos Def	– We Are Hip-Hop, Me, You, Everybody (Disc 1)

I 
 "I Against I" – Massive Attack ft. Mos Def – The Dangerous Mix / Blade II (soundtrack)
 "If You Can Huh ..."	– Mos Def	– Soundbombing
 "Intro"	– Black Star – Black Star
 "Intro"	– Mos Def	– We Are Hip-Hop, Me, You, Everybody (Disc 4)
 "In My Math" – Mos Def – Mos Dub (mixtape)
 "I've Committed Murder (with Macy Gray)"	– Mos Def	– We Are Hip-Hop, Me, You, Everybody (Disc 2)
 "I've Committed Murder (featuring Guru)"	– Mos Def	– Mos Definite

J 
 "Jam On It" – Mos Def – The Dangerous Mix
 "Jump Off (featuring Ludacris) [UK Bonus Track]"	– Mos Def	– The New Danger

K 
 "Kalifornia" – Mos Def – The Dangerous Mix
 "K.O.S. (Determination)" – Black Star – Black Star
 "Know That (featuring Talib Kweli)"	– Mos Def	– Black On Both Sides

L 
 "Life In Marvelous Times" – Mos Def – The Ecstatic
 "Life Is Real" – Mos Def	– The New Danger
 "Lifetime"	– Mos Def	– True Magic
 "Life is Good" -Mos Def – single
 "Light (Can You See It) [with DJ Krush]" – Mos Def	– We Are Hip-Hop, Me, You, Everybody (Disc 2)
 "Little Brother (Black Star)"	– Mos Def	– We Are Hip-Hop, Me, You, Everybody (Disc 2)
 "Love"	– Mos Def	– Black On Both Sides
 "Love Rain (Remix) [with Jill Scott]"	– Mos Def	– We Are Hip-Hop, Me, You, Everybody (Disc 3)
 "Love Song (featuring Bush Babies & De La Soul) – Mos Def – The Dangerous Mix
 "Lyrical Fluctuation 2000"	– Mos Def	– We Are Hip-Hop, Me, You, Everybody (Disc 3)

M 
 "Magnetic Arts (featuring Mos Def) – DJ Honda
 "Magnificent" – Mos Def – The Dangerous Mix
 "Make It All Better (featuring Talib Kweli)"	– Mos Def	– Mos Definite
 "Make It Better"	– Mos Def	– We Are Hip-Hop, Me, You, Everybody (Disc 4)
 "Manifest Destiny (UTD)"	– Mos Def	– We Are Hip-Hop, Me, You, Everybody (Disc 2)
 "Mathematics"	– Mos Def	– Black On Both Sides
 "May–December"	– Mos Def	– Black On Both Sides
 "Modern Marvel"	– Mos Def	– The New Danger
 "Monster Music (featuring Cassidy)"	– Mos Def	– Mos Definite
 "Moon In Cancer"	– Mos Def	– We Are Hip-Hop, Me, You, Everybody (Disc 4)
 "Most Def (Brixx)"	– Mos Def	– We Are Hip-Hop, Me, You, Everybody (Disc 1)
 "Mr. Nigga (featuring Q-Tip"	– Mos Def	– Black On Both Sides
 "Ms. Fat Booty"	– Mos Def	– Black On Both Sides
 "Murder Of A Teenage Life"	– Mos Def	– True Magic
 "My Kung-Fu (UTD)"	– Mos Def	– We Are Hip-Hop, Me, You, Everybody (Disc 1)
 "My Kung-Fu (UTD) [Remix]"	– Mos Def	– We Are Hip-Hop, Me, You, Everybody (Disc 3)

N 
 "Napoleon Dynamite"	– Mos Def	– True Magic
 "New World Water"	– Mos Def	– Black On Both Sides
 "Next Universe"	– Mos Def	– We Are Hip-Hop, Me, You, Everybody (Disc 1)
 "No Hay Nada Mas"	– Mos Def	– The Ecstatic
 "Non Stop"	– Mos Def	– Mos Definite

O 
 "Oh No (with Pharoahe Monch & Nate Dogg)"	– Mos Def – Lyricist Lounge 2
 "One Four Love (Part 1) [with  Common, Kool G Rap, Pharoahe Monch, Posdnuos, Rah Digga, Shabaam Sahdeeq, Sporty Thievz, Talib Kweli]"	– Mos Def	– Hip-Hop For Respect
 "One Four Love (Part 2) [with Cappadonna, Channel Live, Crunch Lo, Shyheim, Wise Intelligent]"	– Mos Def	– Hip-Hop For Respect
 "Outro"	– Mos Def	– Mos Definite

P 
 "Perfect Timing"	– Mos Def	– True Magic
 "Pistola"	– Mos Def	– The Ecstatic
 "Pornographic"	– Mos Def	– Mos Definite
 "Prayer Song (featuring K'naan)" – Mos Def
 "Pretty Dancer"	– Mos Def	– The Ecstatic
 "Priority"	– Mos Def	– The Ecstatic

Q 
 "Quiet Dog Bite Hard"	– Mos Def	– The Ecstatic

R 
 "RE: DEFinition"	– Black Star – Black Star
 "Respiration (featuring Common)"	– Black Star – Black Star
 "Respiration (Dr. Luke Remix) [featuring Common]" – Mos Def – We Are Hip-Hop, Me, You, Everybody (Disc 4)
 "Revelation"	– Mos Def	– The Ecstatic
 "Rock 'N' Roll"	– Mos Def	– Black On Both Sides
 "Rock, Rock Y'all (with A Tribe Called Quest)"	– Mos Def	– We Are Hip-Hop, Me, You, Everybody (Disc 3)
 "Roses (featuring Georgia Anne Muldrow)"	– Mos Def	– The Ecstatic

S 
 "S.O.S. (with Bush Babies)"	– Mos Def	– We Are Hip-Hop, Me, You, Everybody (Disc 1)
 "Saturday Night"	– Mos Def	– We Are Hip-Hop, Me, You, Everybody (Disc 2)
 "Sex, Love & Money"	– Mos Def	– The New Danger
 "Shinjiro (with DJ Krush)"	– Mos Def	– We Are Hip-Hop, Me, You, Everybody (Disc 3)
 "Side B Freestyle (Soundbombing)"	– Mos Def	– We Are Hip-Hop, Me, You, Everybody (Disc 3)
 "Six Days (feat. DJ Shadow) – Mos Def – The Dangerous Mix
 "Smith 'N' Slappy (with Scritti Politti)"	– Mos Def	– We Are Hip-Hop, Me, You, Everybody (Disc 3)
 "Speed Law"	– Mos Def	– Black On Both Sides
 "Stakes Is High (Remix) [with De La Soul]"	– Mos Def	– We Are Hip-Hop, Me, You, Everybody (Disc 1)
 "Summertime"	– Mos Def	– Mos Definite
 "Sun, Moon, Stars"	– Mos Def	– True Magic
 "Sunshine"	– Mos Def	– The New Danger
 "Supermagic"	– Mos Def	– The Ecstatic

T 
 "The Beggar"	– Mos Def	– The New Danger
 "The Easy Spell"	– Mos Def	– The New Danger
 "The Embassy"	– Mos Def	– The Ecstatic
 "The Hard Margin (The Creators)"	– Mos Def	– We Are Hip-Hop, Me, You, Everybody (Disc 1)
 "The Love Song (Bush Babies"	– Mos Def	– We Are Hip-Hop, Me, You, Everybody (Disc 3)
 "The Love Song (Remix f/De La)"	– Mos Def	– We Are Hip-Hop, Me, You, Everybody (Disc 2)
 "The Panties"	– Mos Def	– The New Danger
 "The Questions" (Common)	– Mos Def	– We Are Hip-Hop, Me, You, Everybody (Disc 3)
 "The Rape Over"	– Mos Def	– The New Danger
 "There Is A Way"	– Mos Def	– True Magic
 "Thieves In The Night" – Black Star – Black Star
 "Thug Is A Drug"	– Mos Def	– True Magic
 "Tinseltown To The Boogiedown (Ali Shaheed Remix)"	– Mos Def	– We Are Hip-Hop, Me, You, Everybody (Disc 3)
 "Tinseltown To The Boogiedown (Beatnuts Remix)"	– Mos Def	– We Are Hip-Hop, Me, You, Everybody (Disc 1)
 "Tinseltown To The Boogiedown (Pete Rock Remix)"	– Mos Def	– We Are Hip-Hop, Me, You, Everybody (Disc 2)
 "Tinseltown To The Boogiedown (Rob Swift Variation"	– Mos Def	– We Are Hip-Hop, Me, You, Everybody (Disc 4)
 "Tinseltown To The Boogiedown (with Scritti Politti)"	– Mos Def	– We Are Hip-Hop, Me, You, Everybody (Disc 2)
 "Travellin' Man (featuring Mos Def)"	– DJ Honda	– h II		
 "True Magic"	– Mos Def	– True Magic
 "Twice Inna Lifetime"	– Black Star – Black Star
 "Twilite Speedball"	– Mos Def	– The Ecstatic
 "Tournament" – Mos Def – <Unreleased>

U 
 "U R The One"	– Mos Def	– True Magic
 "Umi Says"	– Mos Def	– Black On Both Sides
 "Undeniable"	– Mos Def	– True Magic
 "Universal Magnetic"	– Mos Def	– Soundbombing

V 
 "Very Well" – Mos Def – <Unreleased>

W 
 "War"	– Mos Def	– The New Danger
 "Wahid"	– Mos Def	– The Ecstatic
 "What's That"	– Mos Def	– Mos Definite
 "Whats That (Que Eso?)"	– Mos Def	– We Are Hip-Hop, Me, You, Everybody (Disc 4)
 "Work It Out" – Mos Def – The Dangerous Mix
 "Workers Comp."	– Mos Def	– The Ecstatic
 "World Famous"	– Mos Def	– Mos Definite
 "Wylin' Out (featuring Diverse) – Mos Def – The Dangerous Mix

X

Y 
 "Yo Yeah"	– Black Star – Black Star
 "You (Feel Good Remix)"	– Mos Def	– We Are Hip-Hop, Me, You, Everybody (Disc 4)

Z 
 "Zimzallabim"	– Mos Def	– The New Danger

See also
Mos Def discography

Mos Def
 List of Mos Def songs